Gerald F. Lange (born February 19, 1928) is an American retired politician in the state of South Dakota. He was a member of the South Dakota House of Representatives and South Dakota State Senate. Lange attended the University of North Dakota, Georgetown University, and the University of Navarra. He was a farmer and college teacher at Dakota State University.

References

Living people
South Dakota Democrats
1928 births
University of North Dakota alumni
Georgetown University alumni
University of Navarra alumni
People from Devils Lake, North Dakota
People from Madison, South Dakota